A fast attack craft (FAC) is a small, fast, agile, offensive, often affordable warship armed with anti-ship missiles, gun or torpedoes. FACs are usually operated in close proximity to land as they lack both the seakeeping and all-round defensive capabilities to survive in blue water. The size of the vessel also limits the fuel, stores and water supplies.

A fast attack craft's main advantage over other warship types is its affordability. Many FACs can be deployed at a relatively low cost, allowing a navy which is at a disadvantage to effectively defend itself against a larger adversary.  A small boat, when equipped with the same weapons as its larger counterpart, can pose a serious threat to even the largest of capital ships. Their major disadvantages are poor seagoing qualities, cramped quarters and poor defence against aerial threats.

History

19th century
As early as the mid-19th century, the Jeune École's poussiere navale theory called for a great number of small, agile vessels to break up invading fleets of larger vessels. The idea was first put into action in the 1870s with the steam-powered torpedo boats, which were produced in large numbers by both the Royal Navy and the French Navy. These new vessels proved especially susceptible to rough seas and to have limited utility in scouting due to their short endurance and low bridges. The potential threat was entirely extinguished with the introduction of the torpedo boat destroyer (TBD) in 1893, a larger vessel which evolved into the modern destroyer. It could mount guns capable of destroying the torpedo boat before it was within range to use its own weapons.

20th century
The idea was revived shortly before World War I with the craft using new gasoline engines. Italy and Great Britain were at the forefront of this design, with the coastal motor boat (CMB) and the motobarca armata silurante (MAS) (Italian: "torpedo armed motorboat"). The outstanding achievement of the class was the sinking of the Austro-Hungarian battleship  by MAS. 15 on 10 June 1918. The equivalent achievement for the CMBs was a lesser success; during the Russian Civil War CMBs attacked the Red Fleet at anchor at Kronstadt on 18 June 1919, sinking the cruiser  for the loss of four craft.

The design matured in the mid-1930s as the motor torpedo boats (MTBs) and motor gunboats (MGBs) of the Royal Navy, the PT boats of the US Navy, and the E-boats (Schnellboote) of the Kriegsmarine. All types saw extensive use during World War II but were limited in effectiveness due to the increasing threat of aircraft; however, some successes were achieved in favourable conditions, as showcased by the crippling of the cruiser  (later scuttled), in the night of 13 August 1942, by Italian MS boats.

Post-World War II
After World War II, the use of this kind of craft steadily declined in the United States and Britain, despite the introduction of safer diesel engines to replace the highly flammable gasoline ones, although the Soviet Union still had large numbers of MGBs and MTBs in service.

With the development of the anti-ship missile, FACs were reborn in the Soviet Union as "missile boats" or "missile cutters". The first few missile boats were originally torpedo boats, with the torpedo tubes replaced by missile launchers. Again, small fast craft could attack and destroy a major warship.

The first combat use of missile boats was an attack by two Egyptian Soviet-built Komar-class boats on the Israeli destroyer Eilat on 20 October 1967, several months after the Six-Day War.  The two boats launched a total of four P-15 missiles, three of which struck the Eilat and sank her with the loss of 47 crew dead or missing and over 90 wounded.

The Soviet FACs prompted a NATO response, which became more intense after the sinking of Eilat. The Germans and French worked together to produce a new FAC, resulting in the  class, first commissioned in 1968. Built until 1974, a total of 68 Combattante IIs were launched. The design was immediately followed by the Combattante III, and a great many other shipyards produced their own versions of the Combattante, including the Israeli Sa'ar/Reshef variants.

Size has also increased, some designs reaching up to corvette size, 800 tonnes including a helicopter, giving them extended modes of operation.

Iran and North Korea have some of the largest numbers of FACs in operation today. North Korea alone operates more than 300, while Iran has been seen developing "swarm boats" to be used as harassing vessels in the heavily contested littoral waters of the Persian Gulf. To counter the threat, the US Navy has been developing an ASUW Littoral Defensive Anti Surface Warfare doctrine, along with vessels such as the littoral combat ship.

See also
Gunboat
Motor gunboat
Torpedo boat
Motor torpedo boat
Missile boat
Patrol boat

References

Ship types
Gunboat classes
Missile boat classes